Marlon Luiz Moraes (born April 26, 1988) is a Brazilian mixed martial artist who competes in the Featherweight division of the Professional Fighters League (PFL). He previously competed in the bantamweight division of the Ultimate Fighting Championship and World Series of Fighting, where he is the former WSOF Bantamweight Champion.

Early career
Moraes got his start in martial arts with Muay Thai at age seven and began training in Brazilian Jiu-Jitsu at age 15. He saw national success in Muay Thai in his native Brazil, earning a pair of Muay Thai National Championships before switching full-time to MMA.

Mixed martial arts career

Xtreme Fighting Championships
On December 2, 2011, Moraes fought Chris Manuel at XFC 15, winning via unanimous decision.

On April 13, 2012, Moraes fought Jarrod Card at XFC 17, He won via knock out in 47 seconds of round one.

World Series of Fighting
In September 2012, Moraes signed with the World Series of Fighting.

On November 3, 2012, Moraes made his promotional debut against former WEC Bantamweight Champion Miguel Torres at WSOF 1. Moraes defeated Torres via split decision.

Following Moraes's victory over Torres, it was announced that at WSOF 2 Moraes would face Tyson Nam. On March 23, 2013, Moraes defeated Nam via knockout due to a head kick and punches in the first round.

Moraes faced Brandon Hempleman at WSOF 4 on August 10, 2013. Moraes won via unanimous decision.

Moraes fought Carson Beebe at WSOF 6 on October 26, 2013. He won via knockout due to punches in just thirty two seconds of round one.

Moraes fought for the inaugural WSOF Bantamweight Championship against Josh Rettinghouse  at WSOF 9. He won via unanimous decision to become the first ever WSOF Bantamweight Champion.

Moraes was scheduled to defend his title against Josh Hill on September 13, 2014, at World Series of Fighting 13. However, Hill was injured and replaced by Cody Bollinger, with the bout being changed to a non-title, catchweight affair.  Moraes won the fight via rear-naked choke submission in the second round.

Moraes was once again scheduled to defend his WSOF Bantamweight Championship against Josh Hill. The rescheduled fight took place on February 12, 2015, at WSOF 18 in Edmonton, Alberta. Moraes won via unanimous decision to retain his WSOF Bantamweight Championship.

Moraes faced Sheymon Moraes on August 1, 2015, at WSOF 22. Marlon Moraes won via rear naked choke submission in the third round to retain his WSOF Bantamweight Championship.

On February 20, 2016, Moraes faced Joseph Barajas at WSOF 28. Moraes won via technical knockout due to leg kicks in the first round to retain his WSOF Bantamweight Championship.

On May 10, 2016, it was announced that Moraes will rematch against Josh Hill for the WSOF Bantamweight Championship at WSOF 32 on July 30, 2016, in the main event. Moraes won the fight via knockout in the second round.

Moraes defended his title against Josenaldo Silva at WSOF 34 on December 31, 2016. He won the fight via technical knockout due to Silva receiving a knee injury.

On January 3, 2017, Moraes vacated the WSOF Bantamweight Championship after becoming an unrestricted free agent.

Ultimate Fighting Championship
In April 2017, it was announced that Moraes had signed with the UFC.

He made his promotional debut against Raphael Assunção at UFC 212 on June 3, 2017. He lost the back-and-forth fight via split decision.

Moraes faced John Dodson on November 11, 2017, at UFC Fight Night 120. He won the back-and-forth fight by split decision.

Moraes made a quick return to the Octagon as he stepped in to replace Rani Yahya against Aljamain Sterling at UFC Fight Night: Swanson vs. Ortega on December 9, 2017. He won the fight via knockout in the first round. The win also earned Moraes his first Performance of the Night bonus award.

After UFC Fight Night 123 in Fresno, the California State Athletic Commission (CSAC) flagged Moraes for gaining more than 10% of his weight back after weigh-ins. His jump from 135.4 pounds on weigh-in day to 155 pounds on fight day was a difference of 14.5%, well over commission regulations of staying within 10% of the contracted weight. CSAC will not license him for bantamweight bouts “without extensive medical documentation from a licensed physician certifying the weight class is appropriate and verified by CSAC physicians.”

Moraes faced Jimmie Rivera on June 1, 2018, at UFC Fight Night 131. Moraes won the fight via first-round knockout due to a head kick and punches in just 33 seconds, becoming the first fighter to finish Rivera in MMA, and snapping Rivera's 20-fight win streak. This win earned him a $50,000 Performance of the Night bonus.

Moraes faced Raphael Assunção in a rematch on February 2, 2019, in the main event at UFC Fight Night 144. Their first fight ended in a split decision loss for Moraes at UFC 212 on June 3, 2017. Moraes won the rematch in the first round by first dropping Assunção with two punches and then securing a guillotine choke submission. This win earned him the Performance of the Night award.

Moraes faced Henry Cejudo on June 8, 2019, at UFC 238 for the vacant UFC Bantamweight Championship. He lost the fight via technical knockout in round three.

Moraes faced former UFC Featherweight Champion José Aldo at UFC 245 on December 14, 2019. He won the fight via split decision.

Moraes faced Cory Sandhagen on October 11, 2020 at UFC Fight Night 179. He lost the fight via technical knockout in round two.

Moraes faced Rob Font on December 19, 2020, at UFC Fight Night 183. He lost the fight via technical knockout in round one.

Moraes faced Merab Dvalishvili on September 25, 2021, at UFC 266. Despite knocking Dvalishvili down twice and nearly finishing him in the first round, Moraes ultimately fatigued and lost the fight via second round TKO.

Moraes faced Song Yadong on March 12, 2022, at UFC Fight Night 203. He lost the bout via punches in round one.

On April 13, 2022 Marlon announced his retirement from MMA via his manager, Ali Abdelaziz. He stated that he wanted to “thank everyone- Sean Shelby, Dana White and the UFC for giving him the opportunity”.

Professional Fighters League 
Less than 6 months after announcing his retirement, Moraes announced that he would be signing with the PFL for the 2023 Featherweight tournament.

Moraes was scheduled to face Shane Burgos in his PFL debut on November 25, 2022 at PFL 10. However, Burgos withdrew from the bout due to an injury. He was replaced by Sheymon Moraes. He lost the bout in the third round via TKO stoppage.

Moraes will start of the 2023 season against Brendan Loughnane on April 1, 2023 at PFL 1.

Championships and accomplishments
 Ultimate Fighting Championship
 Performance of the Night (Three times) vs. Aljamain Sterling, Jimmie Rivera, and Raphael Assunção
World Series of Fighting
WSOF Bantamweight Championship (One time, first)
Most consecutive title defenses (5)
Most wins in title bouts (6)
Most wins (11)
Undefeated (11–0)
MMAJunkie.com
 2019 June Fight of the Month vs. Henry Cejudo

Mixed martial arts record

|-
|Loss
|align=center|
|Sheymon Moraes
|TKO (punches)
|PFL 10
|
|align=center|3
|align=center|0:58
|New York City, New York, United States
|
|-
|Loss
|align=center|
|Song Yadong
|KO (punches)
|UFC Fight Night: Santos vs. Ankalaev
|
|align=center|1
|align=center|2:06
|Las Vegas, Nevada, United States
|
|-
|Loss
|align=center|23–9–1
|Merab Dvalishvili
|TKO (punches)
|UFC 266 
|
|align=center|2
|align=center|4:25
|Las Vegas, Nevada, United States
|
|-
|Loss
|align=center|23–8–1
|Rob Font
|TKO (punches)
|UFC Fight Night: Thompson vs. Neal
|
|align=center|1
|align=center|3:47
|Las Vegas, Nevada, United States
|
|-
|Loss
|align=center|23–7–1
|Cory Sandhagen
|TKO (spinning wheel kick and punches)
|UFC Fight Night: Moraes vs. Sandhagen
|
|align=center|2
|align=center|1:03
|Abu Dhabi, United Arab Emirates
|
|-
|Win
|align=center|23–6–1
|José Aldo
|Decision (split)
|UFC 245 
|
|align=center|3
|align=center|5:00
|Las Vegas, Nevada, United States
|   
|-
|Loss
|align=center|22–6–1
|Henry Cejudo
|TKO (punches)
|UFC 238 
|
|align=center|3
|align=center|4:51
|Chicago, Illinois, United States
|
|-
|Win
|align=center|22–5–1
|Raphael Assunção
|Submission (guillotine choke)
|UFC Fight Night: Assunção vs. Moraes 2
|
|align=center|1
|align=center|3:17
|Fortaleza, Brazil 
|
|-
|Win
|align=center|21–5–1
|Jimmie Rivera
|KO (head kick and punches)
|UFC Fight Night: Rivera vs. Moraes
|
|align=center|1
|align=center|0:33
|Utica, New York, United States
|
|-
|Win
|align=center|20–5–1
|Aljamain Sterling
|KO (knee)
|UFC Fight Night: Swanson vs. Ortega 
|
|align=center|1
|align=center|1:07
|Fresno, California, United States
|
|-
|Win
|align=center|19–5–1
|John Dodson
| Decision (split)
|UFC Fight Night: Poirier vs. Pettis
|
|align=center| 3
|align=center| 5:00
|Norfolk, Virginia, United States
|
|-
|Loss
|align=center|18–5–1
|Raphael Assunção
|Decision (split)
|UFC 212
|
|align=center|3
|align=center|5:00
|Rio de Janeiro, Brazil
|
|-
|Win
|align=center|18–4–1
|Josenaldo Silva
|TKO (knee injury)
|WSOF 34
|
|align=center|1
|align=center|2:30
|New York City, New York, United States
|
|-
|Win
|align=center|17–4–1
|Josh Hill
|KO (head kick and punches)
|WSOF 32
|
|align=center|2
|align=center|0:38
|Everett, Washington, United States
|
|-
|Win
|align=center|16–4–1
|Joseph Barajas
|TKO (leg kicks)
|WSOF 28
|
|align=center|1
|align=center|1:13
|Garden Grove, California, United States
|
|-
|Win
|align=center|15–4–1
|Sheymon Moraes
|Submission (rear-naked choke)
|WSOF 22
|
|align=center|3
|align=center|3:46
|Las Vegas, Nevada, United States
|
|-
|Win
|align=center|14–4–1
|Josh Hill
|Decision (unanimous)
|WSOF 18
|
|align=center|5
|align=center|5:00
|Edmonton, Alberta, Canada
|
|-
|Win
|align=center|13–4–1
|Cody Bollinger
|Submission (rear-naked choke)
|WSOF 13
|
|align=center|2
|align=center|1:35
|Bethlehem, Pennsylvania, United States
|
|-
|Win
|align=center|12–4–1
|Josh Rettinghouse
|Decision (unanimous)
|WSOF 9
|
|align=center|5
|align=center|5:00
|Las Vegas, Nevada, United States
|
|-
|Win
|align=center|11–4–1
|Carson Beebe
|KO (punches)
|WSOF 6
|
|align=center|1
|align=center|0:32
|Coral Gables, Florida, United States
|
|-
|Win
|align=center|
|Brandon Hempleman
|Decision (unanimous)
|WSOF 4
|
|align=center|3
|align=center|5:00
|Ontario, California, United States
|
|-
|Win
|align=center|9–4–1
|Tyson Nam
|KO (head kick and punches)
|WSOF 2
|
|align=center|1
|align=center|2:55
|Atlantic City, New Jersey, United States
|
|-
|Win
|align=center|8–4–1
|Miguel Torres
|Decision (split)
|WSOF 1
|
|align=center|3
|align=center|5:00
|Las Vegas, Nevada, United States
|
|-
|Win
|align=center|7–4–1
|Jarrod Card
|KO (punch)
|XFC 17: Apocalypse
|
|align=center|1
|align=center|0:47
|Jackson, Tennessee, United States
|
|-
|Win
|align=center|6–4–1
|Chris Manuel
|Decision (unanimous)
|XFC 15: Tribute
|
|align=center|3
|align=center|5:00
|Tampa, Florida, United States
|
|-
|Loss
|align=center|5–4–1
|Deividas Taurosevičius
|Submission (arm-triangle choke)
|Ring of Combat 38
|
|align=center|1
|align=center|2:34
|Atlantic City, New Jersey, United States
|
|-
|Loss
|align=center|5–3–1
|Ralph Acosta
|Submission (rear-naked choke)
|World Extreme Fighting 46
|
|align=center|2
|align=center|3:03
|Orlando, Florida, United States
|
|-
|Win
|align=center|5–2–1
|Ryan Bixler
|Submission (Americana)
|RMMA 20: Clash at the Casino
|
|align=center|1
|align=center|1:44
|New Orleans, Louisiana, United States
|
|-
|Win
|align=center|4–2–1
|Nicolas Joannes 
|Submission (rear-naked choke)
|Shoot & Sprawl 2
|
|align=center|1
|align=center|3:49
|Northamptonshire, England
|
|-
|Draw
|align=center|3–2–1
|Sandro China
|Draw (unanimous)
|Dojo Combat 1
|
|align=center|3
|align=center|5:00
|Juiz de Fora, Brazil
|
|-
|Win
|align=center|3–2
|André Rouberte
|TKO (punches)
|Shooto: Brazil 10
|
|align=center|1
|align=center|3:35
|Rio de Janeiro, Brazil
|
|-
|Loss
|align=center|2–2
|Zeilton Rodrigues
|TKO (punches)
|Shooto: Brazil 7
|
|align=center|1
|align=center|1:45
|Rio de Janeiro, Brazil
|
|-
|Loss
|align=center|2–1
|Alexandre Pinheiro	
|TKO (punches)
|Shooto: Brazil 6
|
|align=center|1
|align=center|2:58
|Rio de Janeiro, Brazil
|
|-
|Win
|align=center|2–0
|José Lucas de Melo
|TKO (punches)
|MMA Sports Combat 2
|
|align=center|1
|align=center|N/A
|Rio das Ostras, Brazil
|
|-
|Win
|align=center|1–0
|Bruno Santana
|Submission (rear-naked choke) 
|Desafio: Brazil Fight Center 2
|
|align=center|1
|align=center|N/A
|Rio de Janeiro, Brazil
|
|-

Muay Thai record

|-  style="background:#cfc;"
| 2010-08-14 || Win||align=left| Leonardo Monteiro || VI Desafio Profissional de Muay Thai,  Final || São Paulo, Brazil || Decision || 3||3:00

|-  style="background:#cfc;"
| 2010-08-14 || Win||align=left| Alex Oller || VI Desafio Profissional de Muay Thai, Semi Final || São Paulo, Brazil || Decision (Unanimous) || 3||3:00

|-  style="background:#cfc;"
| 2010-08-14 || Win||align=left| Gilmar Sales || VI Desafio Profissional de Muay Thai, Quarter Final ||São Paulo, Brazil || ||  ||

|-  style="background:#cfc;"
| || Win||align=left| Julio Borges || FEPLAM || Brazil || Decision || 5||3:00

|-  style="background:#cfc;"
| 2009-02-14 || Win||align=left| Bruno Robusto || CBMT - Championship of Brazilian Muay Thai 2009 || Niterói, Brazil ||Decision (Split) || 3 || 3:00

|-  style="background:#fbb;"
| 2007-11-10 || Loss||align=left| Gilmar Sales || Demolition Fight VI || São Paulo, Brazil || Ext.R Decision || 4 || 3:00
|-
! style=background:white colspan=9 |

|-  style="background:#cfc;"
| 2007-10-20 || Win||align=left| Dayvison Texeira || Brasileiros de Muay Thai - Final || Rio de Janeiro, Brazil || Ext.R Decision || 4 || 3:00

|-
| colspan=9 | Legend:

See also
 List of current PFL fighters
 List of male mixed martial artists

References

External links
 
 

1988 births
Living people
Bantamweight mixed martial artists
Mixed martial artists utilizing Muay Thai
Mixed martial artists utilizing Brazilian jiu-jitsu
Brazilian male mixed martial artists
Brazilian practitioners of Brazilian jiu-jitsu
People awarded a black belt in Brazilian jiu-jitsu
Brazilian Muay Thai practitioners
People from Nova Friburgo
Ultimate Fighting Championship male fighters
Sportspeople from Rio de Janeiro (state)